Bert (1934—1956) was one of the most influential sires in the early years of the American Quarter Horse Association (AQHA). He was posthumously inducted into the AQHA Hall of Fame.

Background and early life
Foaled on March 24, 1934 in Tulsa, Oklahoma, Bert was registered as number 227 with the AQHA. His registration entry gives his breeder as Bert Benear of Tulsa, Oklahoma and his color as brown. His sire, Tommy Clegg was a descendant of Peter McCue while his dam, Mayflower,  was descended from both Yellow Jacket and Yellow Wolf. Lady Coolidge was a dun mare foaled in 1928, bred by Mike Beetch of Lawton, Oklahoma. Her dam was a match racing mare with a time of eleven seconds for the 220 yards. Bert's sire was used on the Benear ranch as a cowhorse before he was sold to Howard Martin.

Bert was bought as a colt by Bob Weimer of Council Hill, Oklahoma who named his new purchase after the colt's breeder. Bert was broken as a three-year-old, but before he could start on a riding career, he injured himself in barbed wire, almost cutting his right front foot off. After a recovery lasting months, Bert was sound, but his owner did not feel that it was safe to work him hard, as the colt had been purchased mainly as a breeding stallion prospect. Weimer claimed that he could "turn him out in the morning with the mares and drive out in the pasture in the evening with the pick-up and he will come to me as quick as I call him."

Stud record and honors
Bert sired racehorses, roping horses, and all around ranch horses. He was the sire of eleven race starters, all of whom earned an AQHA Race Register of Merit. His foal who earned the most money on the racetrack was V's Bert, who earned $2777 from forty-eight starts with five wins, twelve seconds and five thirds in six years of racing. He sired four AQHA Champions, as well as Superior Halter horses and Superior Performance horses. His daughter Jeanne's Patsy was the 1955 AQHA High Point Roping horse. His granddaughter Baby Doll Combs was a noted rodeo bulldogging mare known as "Baby Doll" who was inducted into the ProRodeo Hall of Fame in 1979. Bert died in May 1956.

Bert was inducted into the AQHA Hall of Fame in 2007.

Pedigree

References

Additional sources

External links
 Bert at Quarter Horse Directory
 Bert at Quarter Horse Legends

American Quarter Horse sires
1934 animal births
1956 animal deaths
AQHA Hall of Fame (horses)